The following is a list of rugby league referees who have appeared in Australian top-level rugby league, i.e. the NRL and its predecessors, the NSWRL, ARL and SL premierships. Referees still currently active are listed in bold.

Referees 
NOTES:

 Referees are listed in the order of their debut game.
 Referees who debuted in the same day are listed in order alphabetically.
 The statistics in this table are correct as of round 8 of the 2022 NRL season.

Grand Final Referees

See also

NRL match officials

References

Referees
Rugby league referees
National Rugby League referees